Back Alley Oproar is a Warner Bros. Merrie Melodies animated short directed by Friz Freleng The short was released on March 27, 1948, and features Sylvester and Elmer Fudd. The title is a play on "uproar" and "opera". This is a rare exception for Sylvester as he wins in this cartoon. It is a remake of Freleng's Notes to You (1941).

Plot

Elmer is ready for bed, but Sylvester has other plans as he starts singing in Elmer's back yard - an exaggeration of common cat-howling disturbances. A series of gags play out, as Elmer tries everything up his sleeve to get rid of the pest. He eventually confronts Sylvester, but before Elmer can blast him with his shotgun, Sylvester sings a sweet, gentle lullaby to ease him into a deep sleep, even managing to tuck Elmer back into bed. However, the one-man band performance Sylvester subsequently puts on ensures this doesn't last.

Elmer eventually dies in an explosion as a result of an attempt to get rid of Sylvester. His spirit ends up in Heaven, on a cloud ascending into space. Momentarily, he thinks he will finally get some peace and quiet. However, the spirits of Sylvester's nine lives (plus 9 more) ascend and soar around him, each with a numeral on its back, singing the sextet from Lucia di Lammermoor.  One of the cat spirits steals his halo. Elmer's spirit, unable to cope, dives off his cloud and a crash is heard off-screen.

Production 
Back Alley Oproar is a remake of Notes to You (1941), a Looney Tunes short that was also directed by Freleng. It has a similar plot, although the ending of the original does not have the characters die from an explosion (instead, the cat gets shot, and returns as nine singing angels), and the roles of Elmer and Sylvester were taken by Porky Pig and an unnamed alley cat. Back Alley Oproar is one of the few entries in which Sylvester "wins out" over another character, albeit at the presumed cost of his life.

Back Alley Oproar was remade by Freleng in 1967 for The Inspector series as Le Quiet Squad.

Reception 
Greg Ford calls this cartoon "Sylvester's finest hour", writing, "Back Alley Oproar's Sylvester exudes enormous appeal as he tunefully harasses Fudd, his merry medley aided and abetted by Carl Stalling's score, Mel Blanc's virtuosic vocalizations, and Freling's A-list animation team, here led by song-and-dance impresario Gerry Chiniquy."

Release 
Back Alley Oproar was reissued with new Blue Ribbon opening titles and aired on television like this as well. The original title card was restored for the Looney Tunes Golden Collection Vol. 2 DVD and Looney Tunes Platinum Collection: Volume 2, uncut and uncensored.

Home media
DVD - Looney Tunes Golden Collection: Volume 2

References

External links

 
 
 Back Alley Oproar on Park Circus

1948 films
1948 animated films
1948 short films
1948 musical comedy films
Merrie Melodies short films
Elmer Fudd films
Sylvester the Cat films
Short films directed by Friz Freleng
Films scored by Carl Stalling
Warner Bros. Cartoons animated short films
1940s Warner Bros. animated short films
Films with screenplays by Michael Maltese
Animated film remakes
Remakes of American films